The men's 10 metre platform competition of the diving events at the 2019 Pan American Games was held on 5 August  at the Aquatics Centre in Lima, Peru.

Schedule

Results
Green denotes finalists

References 

Diving at the 2019 Pan American Games